Aleksandrów Łódzki is a town in Zgierz County, Łódź Voivodeship, Poland. It is a part of the Łódź agglomeration.

History

In 1820, Rajmund Rembieliński called Aleksandrów "one of the better towns in Poland."  was the author of the town planning project. In order to gain sympathy of the government, Bratoszewski called the town after the then ruling Russian Emperor Alexander I Romanov. This resulted in Aleksandrów gaining the town rights in 1822. After Bratoszewski died in 1824, the Kossowski family took over the town. 

After 1832, the town began to fall back, economically overwhelmed by the nearby towns of Pabianice, Zgierz and Łódź. In the late 19th century and early 20th century, many knitting companies were founded in Aleksandrów, so it is called the cradle of the Polish stocking industry and also gained the nickname "Sock-city" among the citizens. This trade is still the main one today. In 1910, the town gained a tram connection with Łódź, which was discontinued in 1991.

Historically, Aleksandrów was a town of multiple cultures and religions. There were Protestant descendants of German knitters, Jews who were in trade and Catholic Poles who mainly worked as craftsmen and in factories. The Jewish population in 1900 was 1,673. For the Jewish, Aleksandrów was an important religious centre - the seat of Hasidic tzadikim of the Aleksander dynasty founded by Rabbi Yechiel Dancyger (1828–1894). It was also where Rabbi Chanokh Heynekh HaKohen Levin, the second Rebbe of the Ger Hasidim held court until his death in Aleksandrów in 1870.

In 1869, Aleksandrów lost its town rights. These rights were regained in 1924 in the newly reborn Poland.

Currently, it is the seat of the Aleksandrów Łódzki county. In September 2006, the first International Convention of Aleksandrów citizens was held.

Economy
Currently, there are 2,623 registered companies in Aleksandrów. The textile industry constitutes 38% of the economy, trade - 24%, vehicle mechanics and transport - 5%, and other - 33%.

Tourism
The oldest monuments of Aleksandrów include:
 St. Rafael and Michael Catholic church - built between 1816 and 1818 and rebuilt three times (1922–1926 - two aisles added; 1933–1935 - two towers added; 1993 - added a second nave with its own altar). Under the church lies buried Rafał Bratoszewski - founder of Aleksandrów
 Evangelic church - built in 1828 by pastor 
 Jatki - rebuilt in 1998, formerly a place for butchers and bakers to sell their goods; now a part of the town hall
 The town hall - built in 1824. It still serves its function today
 The library - originally the house of a pastor built in 1848
 The oldest grave - dating from 1830, the place of burial for Fryderyk Jerzy Tuve. There is also a Jewish cemetery in the northern part of the town with graves of Hasidic tzadiks
 The city park - an English-styled garden founded by Rafał Bratoszewski in 1824
 Weaver houses - long wooden houses of the first settlers from the first half of the 19th century
 Albert Stiller's villa and factory - built in 1908
 Dormitory of Nicolaus Copernicus High School, a former mansion of Hasidic tzadikim from Danziger dynasty, built in 1935

Sports
 Towarzystwo Sportowe Sokół-Syguła. Founded in 1998, with soccer and karate sections. Stanisław Syguła is the chairman and main sponsor of the club
 MULKS Aleksandrów - established in 2004 - youth soccer
 MKS Aleksandrów - track and field athletics
 UKS Jedynka - volleyball
Sporting events
 Józef Jaworski track and field memorial - held annually since 1983

Local media
 40 i cztery (title is a reference to the tram line number 44 that connected Aleksandrów with Łódź) monthly bulletin issued by the local commune. It has appeared since 8 December 1991, formerly as a biweekly. Current editor-in-chief - Dorota Bełdowska-Zemła
 Alternatywy 44 monthly bulletin issued by the Aleksandrów Association of Entrepreneurs 2000. Current editor-in-chief - Tomasz Dominowski
 Wiadomości aleksandrowskie bulletin of St. by Rafael and Michael parish initiated by Rev. dr Norbert Rucki
 Aleksandrów wczoraj i dziś [Aleksandrów yesterday and today] - a yearly publication appearing since 1983 on behalf of Friends of Aleksandrów Association. Current editor-in-chief - Zenon Kozanecki
 Gazeta Matusiaka, independent newspaper issued by Grzegorz Matusiak in 1992–2004
 TELETOP TV

International relations

Twin towns – sister cities
Aleksandrów Łódzki is twinned with:
  Krāslava, Latvia
  Ossiach, Austria
  Puget-Ville, France

See also

 Aleksander (Hasidic dynasty)

References

External links

  
 Jewish community of Aleksandrów Łódzki on Virtual Shtetl

Cities and towns in Łódź Voivodeship
Historic Jewish communities in Poland
Łódź Voivodeship (1919–1939)
Piotrków Governorate
Zgierz County